The first-generation iPad Mini (stylized and marketed as iPad mini) (known retrospectively as the iPad Mini 1) is a mini tablet computer designed, developed, and marketed by Apple Inc. It was announced on October 23, 2012, as the fourth major product in the iPad line and the first of the iPad Mini line, which features a reduced screen size of , in contrast to the standard . It features similar internal specifications to the iPad 2, including its display resolution.

The first generation iPad Mini received positive reviews, with reviewers praising the device's size, design, and availability of applications, while criticizing its use of a proprietary power connector, its lack of expandable storage, its under-powered Apple A5 chip with 512 MB RAM, and the lack of a Retina display.

History 
On October 16, 2012, Apple announced a media event scheduled for October 23 at the California Theatre in San Jose, California. The company did not predisclose the subject of the event, but it was widely expected to be the iPad Mini.  On the day of the event, Apple CEO Tim Cook introduced a new version of MacBook family and new generations of the MacBook Pro, Mac Mini, and the iMac before the iPad Mini and the higher end fourth-generation iPad.

It was released on November 2, 2012. The US list price started at $329 for the 16 GB model; the UK list price was £269 for the 16 GB model, £349 for the 32 GB model and £429 for the 64 GB model. Similar releases were made in nearly all of Apple's markets. The 32 GB and 64 GB models were discontinued with the release of its successor, the iPad Mini 2 and the iPad Air 1 on October 22, 2013. After almost 3 years on June 19, 2015, the remaining 16 GB model was discontinued as well. As well as being discontinued from stores, the iPad mini no longer receives software updates and is not supported by Apple.

Features

Software 

The iPad Mini shipped with IOS 6.0.1. It can act as a hotspot with some carriers, sharing its Internet connection over Wi-Fi, Bluetooth, or USB, and also access the App Store, a digital application distribution platform for iOS that is developed and maintained by Apple. The service allows users to browse and download applications from the iTunes Store that were developed with Xcode and the iOS SDK and were published through Apple. From the App Store, GarageBand, iMovie, iPhoto, and the iWork apps (Pages, Keynote, and Numbers) are available. Currently the latest versions are IOS 9.3.6 (for Wi-Fi+Cellular models) and iOS 9.3.5 (for Wi-Fi only models)

The iPad Mini comes with several pre-installed applications, including Siri, Safari, Mail, Photos, Video, Music, iTunes, App Store, Maps, Notes, Calendar, Game Center, Photo Booth, and Contacts. Like all iOS devices, the iPad can sync content and other data with a Mac or PC using iTunes, although iOS 5 and later can be managed and backed up with iCloud. Although the tablet is not designed to make telephone calls over a cellular network, users can use a headset or the built-in speaker and microphone and place phone calls over Wi-Fi or cellular using a VoIP application, such as Skype. The device has dictation, using the same voice recognition technology as the iPhone 4S. The user speaks and the iPad types what they say on the screen provided that the iPad is connected to a Wi-Fi or cellular network.

The device has an optional iBooks application, which displays books and other ePub-format content downloaded from the iBookstore. Several major book publishers including Penguin Books, HarperCollins, Simon & Schuster and Macmillan have committed to publishing books for the device. Despite being a direct competitor to both the Amazon Kindle and Barnes & Noble Nook, both Amazon.com and Barnes & Noble offer e-reader apps for the iPad.

On September 17, 2014, iOS 8 was released to the first generation iPad Mini and all Apple Devices. However, some newer features of the software are not supported due to relatively aged hardware that was shared on the iPad 2.

On September 16, 2015, the iPad Mini received the iOS 9 update, but it doesn't have the new multitasking features featured on the other iPads.

On June 13, 2016, Apple announced the iOS 10 update – with some major updates to the mobile operating system. However, the iPad Mini did not receive this update (along with other devices using the A5 processor including the iPhone 4S, iPad 2, iPad (3rd generation), and iPod Touch (5th generation)) due to hardware limitations.

While Apple stopping the latest iOS updates for the iPad Mini was expected by many in the industry, it has however led to some criticism, as the device was on sale until June 2015 and by June 2016, no further versions of the operating system beyond iOS 9 were to be made available to the tablet.

Hardware 

There are four buttons and one switch on the iPad Mini, including a "home" button near the display that returns the user to the home screen, and three aluminum buttons on the right side and top: wake/sleep and volume up and volume down, plus a software-controlled switch whose function varies with software updates. The tablet is manufactured either with or without the capability to communicate over a cellular network. All models can connect to a wireless LAN via Wi-Fi. The iPad Mini is available with 16, 32, 64 GB of internal flash memory, with no expansion option. Apple sells a "camera connection kit" with an SD card reader, but it can only be used to transfer photos and videos.

The iPad Mini features partially the same hardware as the iPad 2. Both screens have resolutions of 1024 x 768, but the iPad Mini has a smaller screen and thus higher pixel density than iPad 2 (163 PPI vs 132 PPI). Unlike the iPad 2, it has 5 MP and 1.2 MP cameras and the Lightning connector. The system-on-chip is A5, which is the same one found in the later revision of the iPad 2 (32 nm). The audio processor is the same found in iPhone 5 and iPad 4th generation, which allows the iPad Mini to have Siri and voice dictation unlike the iPad 2. The graphics processor (GPU) of the iPad Mini is the same one found in the iPad 2 (PowerVR SGX543MP2). The iPad Mini was initially featured with slate and silver colors, however on the release of the Mini 2 the slate color was changed to space gray; the silver color remained.

Accessories 

The Smart Cover, introduced with the iPad 2, is a screen protector that magnetically attaches to the face of the iPad. A smaller version was available for the iPad Mini 1, but later models including the iPad Mini 4 also use their own Smart Cover. The cover has three folds, which allow it to convert into a stand, held together by magnets. Smart Covers have a microfiber bottom that cleans the front of the iPad, and wakes up the unit when the cover is removed. It comes in six colors of polyurethane.

Apple offers other accessories, including a Bluetooth keyboard, several types of earbuds or headphones and many adapters for the Lightning connector. AppleCare and free engraving are also available for the iPad Mini.

Reception 
Reviews of the first generation iPad Mini have been positive, with reviewers praising the device's size, design, and availability of applications, while criticizing its use of a proprietary power connector and its lack of expandable storage and Retina display. The device competes with tablets such as the Amazon Kindle Fire HD, Google Nexus 7, and Barnes & Noble Nook HD. Joshua Topolsky of The Verge praised the industrial design of the iPad Mini, however panned its lack of Retina display and price.

See also 

 Comparison of tablet computers
 List of iOS devices

References

External links 

 – official site

Mini
Products and services discontinued in 2016
IOS
Tablet computers
Touchscreen portable media players
Tablet computers introduced in 2012

de:Apple iPad#iPad Mini